Pygmaepterys philcloveri is a species of sea snail, a marine gastropod mollusk in the family Muricidae, the murex snails or rock snails.

Description

Distribution
This marine species occurs off Mindanao, the Philippines.

References

 Houart R. (1984). Poiriera (Pazinotus) philcloveri, a new species from the Philippine Islands (Gastropoda: Muricidae: Muricinae). Informations de la Société Belge de Malacologie. ser. 12, 2-3: 127-130

External links
 D'Attilio A. & Myers B.W. (1985). A new species of Pygmaepterys Vokes from the western Pacific (Gastropoda: Muricidae). The Nautilus. 99(1): 9-13

Muricidae
Gastropods described in 1984